Szymon Czyż (born 8 July 2001) is a Polish professional footballer who plays as a midfielder for Ekstraklasa club Raków Częstochowa.

Professional career
A youth product of Arka Gdynia and Lech Poznań, Czyż signed with Lazio in 2018. Czyż made his professional debut with Lazio in a 1–1 UEFA Champions League draw against Club Brugge on 28 October 2020. He moved on a permanent transfer to Warta Poznań in the summer of 2021.

On 10 January 2022, he was transferred to Raków Częstochowa, signing a three-and-a-half-year deal. On 11 September 2022, shortly after obtaining a regular spot in Raków's starting line-up, he suffered an anterior cruciate ligament tear in a 4–0 league win against Legia Warsaw, ruling him out for at least six months.

Career statistics

Club

Honours
Raków Częstochowa
Polish Cup: 2021–22
Polish Super Cup: 2022

References

External links
 
 Łączy nas piłka Profile
 

2001 births
Living people
People from Puck, Poland
Polish footballers
Poland youth international footballers
Poland under-21 international footballers
Association football midfielders
S.S. Lazio players
Warta Poznań players
Raków Częstochowa players
Serie A players
Ekstraklasa players
Polish expatriate footballers
Polish expatriates in Italy
Expatriate footballers in Italy